Mutlucan Zavotçu (born 8 February 1981) is a Turkish football manager and former footballer. Currently, he coaches Çaykur Rizespor in the Women's Super League.

Sports career

Player
Zavotçu began his footballer career as an amateur at Galatasaray S.K. on 27 November 1998. After playing for the amateur clubs Pazariçi Köprülü and Küçükçekmecespor, he became professional and transferred to Zeytinburnuspor in August 2002. His next club was Alibeyköy. In August 2006, Zavotçu moved to his hometown to play for Karsspor. After one season, he returned to amateur status and  signed with IFA, at which he then ended his playing career.

Manager
Beşiktaş J.K. women's
On 31 October 2014 Zavotçu was appointed manager of the Beşiktaş J.K. women's football team, playing in the Turkish Women's Third Football League. He led the team to the Second League after winning the play-off matches at the end of the 2014–15 season. The next season, his team became champion of the Second League and was promoted to the Turkish Women's First Football League. He also led the team to win the regular 2016–17 Women's FirstLeague, failed however to become champion after the play-off round. His team became runner-up behind Konak Belediyespor, who won the title fifth time in a row. Beşiktaş J.K. finished the 2018-19 Turkish Women's First League season as leader with goal average equal on points with ALG Spor. He enjoyed his team's champion title for the first time in the First League after Beşiktaş J.K. defeated ALG Spor in the play-off match with 1–0.

By late September 2020, Zavotçu announced that he left Beşiktaş J.K. women's team, which he managed nine years.

Fenerbahçe S.K. women's
By July 2021, prior to the establishment of the women's side of Fenerbahçe S.K., the club decided firstly to transfer Mutlucan Zavotçu as manager taking in considerarton of his achievements by the founding and development of Beşiktaş J.K.

Lüleburgaz S.K.
Beginning of September 2021, Turkish Regional Amateur League (BAL) club Lüleburgazspor announced that they signed with Zavotçu for the upcoming 2021-22 BAL Region 8 Group 1 season.

Çaykur Rizespor women's
Zavotçu was appointed manager of the newly established Çaykur Rizespor replacing İlknur Aktaş in third round of the 2021-22 Women's Super League season.

Statistics
.

Honours
 Turkish Women's First League
 Beşiktaş J.K.
 Winners (1): 2018–19
 Runners-up (3): 2016–17, 2017–18, 2019–20

 Turkish Women's Second League
 Beşiktaş J.K.
 Winners (1): 2015–16

 Turkish Women's Third League
 Beşiktaş J.K.
 Winners (1): 2014–15

References

Living people
1981 births
People from Arpaçay
Turkish footballers
Galatasaray S.K. footballers
Zeytinburnuspor footballers
Alibeyköyspor footballers
Turkish women's football managers
Association footballers not categorized by position
Beşiktaş J.K. (women's football) managers